Alia Trabucco Zerán (born 26 August 1983) is a Chilean writer. She has an MFA in creative writing in Spanish from New York University and a PhD in Spanish and Latin American studies from University College London. Her debut novel La Resta (The Remainder) was critically acclaimed and won the 2014 Chilean Council for the Arts prize for Best Unpublished Literary Work. In 2015 it was chosen by El País as one of the ten best debut novels that year. It was translated into English by Sophie Hughes and published by And Other Stories in 2018. The Remainder was shortlisted for the 2019 Man Booker International Prize. Her book When Women Kill was a finalist for the 2023 National Book Critics Circle award in criticism. and winner of the 2022 British Academy Book Prize for Global Cultural Understanding. Her latest book is Limpia (Clean).

Books 
 2015: La Resta. Madrid: Demipage. 
("The Remainder." Translated by Sophie Hughes. And Other Stories, UK, (2019). Coffee House Press, US (2019) )
2019: "Las Homicidas." Santiago: Lumen.
("When Women Kill: Four Crimes Retold." Translated by Sophie Hughes. And Other Stories, UK (2022), Coffee House Press, US (2022) )
2022: "Limpia". Santiago: Lumen.

References

External links 
 "A Bitter Pill" (short story) Translated by Sophie Hughes in Words Without Borders. April, 2019.
 "An Interview with Man Booker International Shortlisters Alia Trabucco Zerán and Sophie Hughes" (interview) Translated by Susannah Greenblatt in Words Without Borders. May, 2019.

Living people
21st-century Chilean women writers
1983 births
New York University alumni
Alumni of University College London